Mara Mather is a professor of gerontology and psychology at the USC Davis School of Gerontology. Her research deals with aging and affective neuroscience, focusing on how emotion and stress affect memory and decisions. She is the daughter of mathematician John N. Mather.

Career 

Mather is best known for her contributions to research on emotion and memory. Her work with Laura Carstensen and Susan Charles revealed a positivity effect in older adults’ attention and memory, in which older adults favor positive information more and negative information less in their attention and memory than younger adults do. Perhaps the most intuitive explanation for this effect is that it is related to some sort of age-related decline in neural processes that detect and encode negative information. However, her research indicates that this is not the case; her findings suggest that older adults’ positivity effect is the result of strategic processes that help maintain well-being.

She has also been investigating how emotional arousal shapes memory. Mather and her graduate student Matthew Sutherland outlined an arousal-biased competition (ABC) model that they argue can account for a disparate array of emotional memory effects, including some effects that initially appear contradictory (e.g., emotion-induced retrograde amnesia vs. emotion-induced retrograde enhancement). ABC model posits that arousal leads to both "winner-take-more" and "loser-take-less" effects in memory by biasing competition to enhance high priority information and suppress low priority information. Priority is determined by both bottom-up salience and top-down goal relevance. Previous theories fail to account for the broad array of selective emotional memory effects in the literature, and so the ABC model fills a key theoretical hole in the field of emotional memory.

Mather's research projects have included work on how older adults interpret positive stimuli as well as how stress influences older adults' decision making processes and the differences between men and women's decision-making processes under stress.

Honors 
 National Institute on Aging K02 Career Development Award
 Distinguished Scientific Award for Early Career Contribution to Psychology from the American Psychological Association
 Richard Kalish Innovative Publication Award from the Gerontological Society of America
 Excellence in Teaching Award from the UC Santa Cruz Committee on Teaching
 Springer Early Career Achievement Award in Research on Adult Development and Aging
 Margret Baltes Dissertation Award in the Psychology of Aging from APA Division 20
 American Psychological Association Dissertation Research Award
 National Science Foundation Graduate Fellowship
 Alexander von Humboldt Foundation Research Fellowship

Selected publications 
 Mather, M. (2007). Emotional arousal and memory binding: An object-based framework. Perspectives on Psychological Science, 2, 33-52.
 Mather, M., Gorlick, M. A., & Lighthall, N.R. (2009). To brake or accelerate when the light turns yellow? Stress reduces older adults' risk taking in a driving game. Psychological Science, 20, 174-176.
 Mather, M., & Sutherland, M.R. (2011). Arousal-biased competition in perception and memory. Perspectives on Psychological Science, 6, 114-133.
 Nashiro, K., Sakaki, M., & Mather, M. (2011). Age differences in brain activity during emotion processing: Reflections of age-related decline or increased emotion regulation? Gerontology.
 Sakaki, M., Niki, K., & Mather, M. (2011). Updating existing emotional memories involves the frontopolar/orbitofrontal cortex in ways that acquiring new emotional memories does not. Journal of Cognitive Neuroscience, 23, 3498-3514.
 Mather, M, & Lighthall, N.R. (in press). Both risk and reward are processed differently in decisions made under stress. Current Directions in Psychological Science.

References

External links
University of Southern California Davis School of Gerontology

American women psychologists
American gerontologists
American cognitive neuroscientists
American women neuroscientists
Memory researchers
Women medical researchers
University of Southern California faculty
Princeton University alumni
Stanford University alumni
Living people
Year of birth missing (living people)
American women academics
21st-century American women scientists